Ivana Lisjak (Croatian pronunciation: [ǐʋana lǐsjaːk]; born March 17, 1987) is a former tennis player from Croatia. She turned professional at the age of 14, peaked at No. 95 on the WTA rankings, and retired in 2013 due to chronic injuries.

In Croatia, Lisjak was No. 1 in the girls' under-10, 12, 14, and 16 as well as ranked No. 1 in Europe under-12 and 14.

Post-tennis career
While a professional tennis player, Lisjak received a bachelor's degree in sports management and a bachelor's degree in business and economics.

ITF Circuit finals

Singles: 15 (7 titles, 8 runner-ups)

Doubles: 7 (1 title, 6 runner-ups)

References

External links
 
 

1987 births
Croatian female tennis players
Living people
Sportspeople from Čakovec